Zygmunt Szendzielarz (12 March 1910 – 8 February 1951) was the commander of the Polish 5th Wilno Brigade of the Home Army (Armia Krajowa), nom de guerre "Łupaszka". He fought against the Red Army after the end of the Second World War. Following the Soviet takeover of Poland at the end of World War II he was arrested, accused of numerous crimes and executed in the Mokotów Prison as one of the anti-communist cursed soldiers. After the fall of communism, in 1993, Szendzielarz was rehabilitated and declared innocent of all charges. In 2007 Polish president Lech Kaczyński posthumously awarded Szendzielarz with the order of Polonia Restituta. His involvement in the Dubingiai massacre of 1944, however, remains controversial.

Life
Szendzielarz was born in Stryj (Austrian Partition, now Lviv Oblast, Ukraine), then part of the Austro-Hungarian Empire and from 1919 to 1939 in Poland, into the family of a railway worker. After graduating from primary school in Lwów, he attended a biological-mathematical gymnasium in Lwów and then Stryj. After graduating, he volunteered for the Polish Army and completed Infantry Non-commissioned officer School in Ostrów Mazowiecka (1932), then Cavalry NCO School in Grudziądz. He was promoted to lieutenant and transferred to Wilno, where he assumed command of a squadron in the 4th Uhlan Regiment.

World War II

With his unit, he took part in the 1939 September Campaign. His unit was attached to the Wilno Cavalry Brigade under General Władysław Anders, part of the Prusy Army. After retreating from northern Poland, the forces of Gen. Anders fought their way towards the city of Lwów and the Romanian Bridgehead. However, in the area of Lublin Szendzielarz's unit was surrounded and suffered heavy losses. Soon afterwards Szendzielarz was taken prisoner of war by the Soviets, but he managed to escape to Lwów, where he lived for a short period under a false name. He tried to cross the Hungarian border to escape from Poland and reach the Polish Army being formed in France, but failed and finally moved with his family to Wilno.

In Wilno, Szendzielarz started working on various posts under false names. In mid-1943 he joined the Home Army under the nom de guerre Łupaszka, after Jerzy Dąbrowski, and in August he started organizing his own partisan group in the forests surrounding the city. Soon the unit was joined by local volunteers and the remnants of a unit of Antoni Burzyński ("Kmicic"), destroyed by Soviet Partisans and the Wehrmacht. By September, the unit was 700 men strong and was officially named the 5th Vilnian Home Army Brigade (5 Wileńska Brygada Armii Krajowej).

Łupaszko's unit fought against the German army and SS units in the area of southern Wilno Voivodeship, but was also frequently attacked by the Soviet Partisans paradropped in the area by the Red Army. In April 1944, Zygmunt Szendzielarz was arrested by the Lithuanian police and handed over to the Gestapo. Łupaszko was free in the same month under circumstances that remain unclear. In reprisal actions, his brigade captured several dozen German officials and sent several threatening letters to Gestapo but it remains unknown if and how these contributed to his release.

Dubingiai massacre 

On 20 June 1944 a Lithuanian unit of the Schutzmannschaft murdered 39 Poles in Glinciszki, including women and children. Lithuanian collaborator units have also harassed civilian Polish population in Pawłów, Adamowszczyzna, and Sieńkowszczyzna. In reprisal, on 23 June 1944, a unit of 5th Vilnian Home Army Brigade attacked the fortified village of Dubingiai, capturing a bunker defended by Lithuanian policemen. The order to attack the village was given by Szendzielarz. Dubingiai became the target of the attack due to many of the policemen, and their families, responsible for the Glinciszki crime living there. Having the list of people who collaborated with the occupier, the Poles began action to avenge the death of the residents of Glinciszki.  According to historian Paweł Rokicki, the actions in Dubingiai are a war crime, and the deaths of the civilians were intentional. In Dubingiai between 21 and 27 inhabitants of the village died, including women and children.

Operation Ostra Brama 
In August, the commander of all Home Army units in the Wilno area, Gen. Aleksander "Wilk" Krzyżanowski, ordered all six brigades under his command to prepare for Operation Tempest — a planned all-national rising against the German forces occupying Poland. In what became known as Operation Ostra Brama, Brigade V was to attack the Wilno suburb of Zwierzyniec in cooperation with advancing units of the 3rd Belorussian Front. However, Łupaszko, for fear of being arrested with his units by the NKVD and killed on the spot, disobeyed orders and moved his unit to central Poland. Wilno was liberated by Polish and Soviet forces, and the Polish commander was then arrested by the Soviets and the majority of his men were sent to Gulags and sites of detention in the Soviet Union.

It is uncertain why Szendzielarz was not court-martialed for desertion. Most likely it was in fact General "Wilk" himself who ordered Łupaszko's unit away from the Wilno area, due to Łupaszko long having been involved in fighting with Soviet partisans and Wilk not wanting to provoke the Red Army. Regardless, after crossing into the Podlasie and Białystok area in October, the brigade continued the struggle against withdrawing Germans in the ranks of the Białystok Home Army Area. Zygmunt Szendzielarz, the commander of the 5th Brigade,  was responsible for the massacres in the area on several Lithuanian and Belarusian villages. Łupaszko's unit remained in the forests and he decided to await the outcome of Russo-Polish talks held by the Polish Government in Exile. Meanwhile, the unit was reorganized and captured enough equipment to fully arm 600 men with machine guns and machine pistols.

After World War II
After the governments of the United Kingdom and the United States broke the pacts with Poland and accepted the communist "Polish Committee of National Liberation" as the provisional government of Poland, Łupaszka restarted hostilities—this time against the new oppressor, in the ranks of Wolność i Niezawisłość organization. However, after several successful actions against the NKVD units in the area of Białowieża Forest, it became apparent that such actions would result in the total destruction of his unit.

In February 1945 his wife died and the nurse Lidia Lwow-Eberle became his partner.

In September 1945, Zygmunt Szendzielarz moved with a large part of his unit to Gdańsk-Oliwa, where he remained underground while preparing his unit for a new partisan offensive against the Soviet-backed communist authorities of Poland. On 14 April 1946 Szendzielarz finally mobilized his unit and headed for the Tuchola Forest, where he started operations against the forces of the Internal Security Corps, Urząd Bezpieczeństwa and the communist authorities. Łupaszko was hoping that in the spring of 1946 the former Western Allies of Poland would start a new war against the Soviet Union and that the Polish underground units could prove useful in liberating Poland. However, when he realized that no such war was planned he decided to disband his unit. He saw the further fight as a waste of blood of his men and decided to retire from the open fight against the communists.

After several years underground, he was arrested by the UB on 28 June 1948, in Osielec near Nowy Targ. After more than two years of brutal interrogation and torture in Warsaw's Mokotów Prison he was sentenced to death on 2 November 1950 by the Soviet-controlled court-martial in Warsaw. He was executed on 8 February 1951, together with several other Home Army soldiers. Szendzielarz was 40 years old. His body was buried in an undisclosed location. During a 2013 exhumation Szendzielarz's remains were recovered and identified as one of roughly 250 bodies buried in a mass grave at the Meadow at Warsaw's Powązki Military Cemetery.

Posthumous history
After Łupaszko's death, communist authorities accused him of many crimes, from the crimes against humanity to robbery and common theft. In 1988 Szendzielarz was posthumously promoted to rotmistrz and awarded the Virtuti Militari, Poland's highest military decoration, by Kazimierz Sabbat, the President of Poland in exile.

After the fall of communism, in 1993, Szendzielarz was rehabilitated and declared innocent of all charges. His exection, like those of other "cursed soldiers" was overturned as a Communist judicial crime. On 2007 Polish president Lech Kaczyński posthumously awarded Szendzielarz with the order of Polonia Restituta.

Honours and awards
 Virtuti Militari, V class; for participation in the September 1939 campaign
 Cross of Valour (January 1944)
 Gold Cross, Virtuti Militari (25 June 1988) in recognition of outstanding deeds during the war
 Grand Cross of the Order of Polonia Restituta, awarded by Polish President Lech Kaczynski, 11 November 2007

See also
Paweł Jasienica
List of Poles
Danuta Siedzikówna

References

Further reading

1910 births
1951 deaths
People from Stryi
People from the Kingdom of Galicia and Lodomeria
Polish Austro-Hungarians
Polish Army officers
Home Army members
Cursed soldiers
Recipients of the Gold Cross of the Virtuti Militari
Recipients of the Cross of Valour (Poland)
Polish anti-communists
Polish mass murderers
Grand Crosses of the Order of Polonia Restituta
Executed military personnel
Executed Polish people
Polish torture victims
People executed by the Polish People's Republic
People executed by Poland by firearm
Polish People's Republic rehabilitations
Polish people convicted of war crimes
Burials at Powązki Military Cemetery
People executed for war crimes
Executed mass murderers